Eleni Antoniadou is a Greek public figure and impostor.

In September 2019 her credentials came under scrutiny after allegations of misrepresentation. This resulted in several Greek and international media investigating her claims, which have been proven to be false or, in some cases, exaggerated.

Background

Early life and education 
Eleni Antoniadou was born in Thessaloniki, Greece in 1988. She studied Computer Science and Biomedical Informatics at the University of Central Greece and received a Master's degree in Nanotechnology and Regenerative Medicine from University College London.

Career 
She has been reported as being a scientist active in the fields of regenerative medicine, artificial organ bioengineering and space medicine. Antoniadou co-founded a company called Transplants without Donors.

In 2014, she was included in the BBC's 100 Women, and in 2015 in Forbes 30 amazing women under 30.

In 2016 she served as president of the 2nd regular annual convention of the European Health Parliament, which describes itself as a multidisciplinary movement to suggest solutions for health to the European Union policymakers.

Toy maker Mattel produced a special edition Barbie doll with Antoniadou's image as part of their 60th anniversary Role Models series. The replica was the first time a Barbie doll portrayed a woman from Greece. The production of the doll was cancelled after allegations of misrepresentation surfaced in 2019.

Criticism 

After a commendation by the Minister of Education Niki Kerameus in 2019, scientists raised concerns that Greek media may not have verified her academic credentials and that she may have misrepresented her achievements. Greek Wikipedia later modified its article on Antoniadou after the misrepresentations were revealed, and Greek think tank Dianeosis (διαΝΕΟσις) removed her from their advisory committee.

According to the website 'Ellinika Hoaxes', the claim that she is "the scientist who made the world's first artificial trachea from stem cells that were successfully transplanted into a patient" is untrue, as the recipient passed away just 18 months after the operation, while the surgeon who performed it, Paolo Macchiarini, was heavily criticized for wrong medical practices and fired from the Karolinska Institute where he worked. Antoniadou's name was absent from the scientific publication concerning both the construction of the trachea and the operation. A few months after the death of the patient, Antoniadou appeared in interviews and incorrectly stated that the patient survived. The publication in the Journal of Biomedical Materials Research is now retracted.

Despite the relevant reports and her resume, Antoniadou did not work directly for NASA nor did she participate in astronaut training, as reported in an interview, but instead participated in a short-lived space clothing experiment. The claim that she received the NASA-ESA Outstanding Researcher Award in 2012 is not confirmed. According to NASA Johns Hopkins University space scientist Stamatis Krimizis, NASA and ESA have only separate awards. It also does not have a name on NASA's list of recipient awards until 2012.

A BBC publication heavily criticised Greek media and their role, which, while conducting several interviews with Antoniadou, did not verify or factcheck whether what was attributed to her was correct. The BBC itself had earlier included her in the 100 Women of 2014. The European People's Party included her in a Twitter post as one of the 11 most important Greeks of the twentieth century.

Doctoral Thesis
In 2022, three years after the events that resulted in public critisism, Antoniadou, under her new identity name Eleni Antoniadou Dimokidis, submitted her Ph.D thesis at the University College London entitled "Characterization of Human Amniotic Fluid Stem Cells for Biobanking and Stem Cell Therapy". The access to the thesis however is, as of January 2023, restricted and the abstract redacted.

References 

1988 births
Living people
Greek biologists
Greek women scientists
Alumni of University College London
Scientists from Thessaloniki
BBC 100 Women